Aata Hou De Dhingana is an Indian Marathi language television game show that premiered on 10 September 2022 aired on Star Pravah. It digitally streams on Disney+ Hotstar. The series is hosted by Siddhartha Jadhav.

Concept 
The show features thirteen Star Pravah's shows competing against each other in a music competition.

Special episode 
 1 January 2023 (2.30 hours)
 12 February 2023 (1.30 hours)

Teams

Tasks 
 Dhun Tak
 Ishara Tula Kalala Na
 Bobdi Valali
 Sade Made Shintode
 Rekhata Patapata
 Bol Bala Bol
 Fadfad Englishchi Chirfad

Guests

References

External links 
 Aata Hou De Dhingana at Disney+ Hotstar

Star Pravah original programming
Marathi-language television shows
Indian reality television series
2022 Indian television series debuts